The 1939 Saint Louis Billikens football team was an American football team that represented Saint Louis University as a member of the Missouri Valley Conference (MVC) during the 1939 college football season. In its sixth and final season under head coach Cecil Muellerleile, the team compiled a 5–3–2 record and outscored opponents by a total of 103 to 95. The team played its home games at Edward J. Walsh Memorial Stadium in St. Louis.

Schedule

References

Saint Louis
Saint Louis Billikens football seasons
Saint Louis Billikens football